Tom Newell may refer to:

 Tom Newell (basketball), American former professional basketball coach
 Tom Newell (baseball) (born 1963), former Major League Baseball pitcher
 Tom Newell (politician) (born 1968), American politician in the Oklahoma House of Representatives